Sir Michael Cole was an Irish politician.

He was the son of Michael Cole and Alice Coote, and grandson of Sir William Cole, Provost of Enniskillen. Sir John  Cole, 1st Baronet, was his uncle and father-in-law. By his wife and cousin Elizabeth Cole, daughter of Sir John and his wife Elizabeth Chichester, he had a son, John Cole MP, who was the father of John Cole, 1st Baron Mountflorence.

Michael Cole was educated at Trinity College, Dublin. Cole represented Enniskillen from 1692 until 1713.

References

Irish MPs 1692–1693
Irish MPs 1695–1699
Irish MPs 1703–1713
Members of the Parliament of Ireland (pre-1801) for County Fermanagh constituencies
Alumni of Trinity College Dublin